Colin Stinton (born March 10, 1947) is a Canadian actor.

Early life
Born in Calgary, Alberta, Canada in 1947, Stinton moved to the United States as a child in 1952. He lived in a trailer with his family—traveling throughout the U.S. and finally settling in the Chicago area. There he attended Northern Illinois University, acting in several campus productions and joining an alumni group that performed in Chicago as the Dinglefest Theatre Company, which later established The Theatre Building. He spent several years as part of the Chicago theatre scene where he met and worked frequently with playwright-director David Mamet.

Career
Stinton lived in New York, 1978–1985, during which he created the title role in Mamet's Edmond, and received a Theatre World Award for his role in Mamet's The Water Engine, on Broadway. He moved to London in 1985, where he spent several years at the National Theatre in addition to work in the West End and in film, television and radio. He returned to New York to earn a Drama Desk Award nomination for his role in the U.S. premier of Richard Nelson's Some Americans Abroad, and played Mr. Robinson in both the London and New York stage versions of The Graduate.

He was in the original stage production of Rain Man in London and a West End revival of The Pajama Game in 2014. His stage work includes premieres of new plays by David Mamet, Jean-Claude van Itallie, Richard Nelson, Dusty Hughes, David Hare, John Osborne, and Tom Stoppard.

He played Neal Daniels in The Bourne Ultimatum. Other roles include President Arthur Coleman Winters in the Doctor Who episode "The Sound of Drums", US Secretary of State Al Haig in The Falklands Play, the US Ambassador to the United Kingdom in The Trial of Tony Blair, the United States Secretary of State Traynor Styles in Spooks, and Justice Robert H. Jackson in the BBC docudrama Nuremberg: Nazis on Trial.

He appeared as Dr. Dave Greenwalt in the James Bond film Tomorrow Never Dies and the disbelieving Detective Cartert in the Arielle Kebbel horror vehicle Freakdog. He played opinionated news caster Anthony Markowitz in Broken News.

Stinton played the part of an American named Charles Lester in one of Agatha Christie's Poirot serials Poirot's Early Cases entitled "The Lost Mine". He also appears as the head judge in the 2001 music video, "Murder on the Dancefloor", by Sophie Ellis-Bextor.

He appeared as Lt Colonel Hoyt Jackson for the US Justice Department, tracking a Nazi war criminal in Foyle's War Series 8, Episode 3, "Sunflower" in 2013.

Personal life
Stinton now lives in Walthamstow, Greater London; and in Chicago.

Partial filmography

The Verdict (1982) - Billy
Daniel (1983) - Dale
The Russia House (1990) - Henziger
Homicide (1991) - Walter B. Wells
Flodders in America (1992) - Jack
Ghostwatch (1992) - Dr. Emilio Sylvestri
In Love and War (1996) - Tom Burnside
Tomorrow Never Dies (1997) - Dr. Dave Greenwalt
The Winslow Boy (1999) - Desmond Curry
Spy Game (2001) - Henry Pollard
Ali G Indahouse (2002) - US Delegate
Thunderpants (2002) - Foster
The Hours (2002) - Hotel Clerk
Quicksand (2003) - Harbinson
The Machinist (2004) - Inspector Rogers
Closer (2004) - Customs Officer
The Jacket (2005) - Jury Foreman
Proof (2005) - Theoretical Physicist
The Kovak Box (2006) - Encargado Consulado
Big Nothing (2006) - Max
The Bourne Ultimatum (2007) - Neal Daniels
Doctor Who (2007) - President Winters
Transsiberian (2008) - Embassy Official
Freakdog (2008) - Detective Cartert
Captain America: The First Avenger (2011) - New York Taxi Driver (uncredited)
City Slacker (2012) - Freddie
Rush (2013) - Teddy Mayer
Borg vs McEnroe (2017) - Talk show host
Adults in the Room (2019)
The Crown (2019) - Lawrence E. Spivak
Wonder Woman 1984 (2021) — NORAD colonel

References

External links

1947 births
Living people
Canadian male film actors
Canadian male television actors
Canadian male voice actors
Canadian emigrants to the United States
Canadian expatriate male actors in the United States
Canadian expatriates in England
Male actors from Calgary